Canusa Street is the only part of the Canada–United States border that runs down the middle of a street. The street separates Beebe Plain, Vermont, in the United States, from the Beebe Plain area of Stanstead, Quebec, in Canada, and is a part of Quebec Route 247. The name Canusa is formed of Can- for Canada and -usa for the United States of America (USA).

History and description
Local legend claims that a group of rather drunken surveyors, when given the task of determining the United States–Canada border line in the region (nominally at 45.00°N), decided to place the border right through the center of the village along what is now Canusa Street. On the current cadastral graphic matrix, however, the border line is drawn along the southern border to the street, suggesting that it is entirely located within Canada.

At the west end of Canusa Street is the Beebe Plain–Beebe Border Crossing. Immediately facing the customs houses, located at the end of the street, is a solid granite line house. This building (built as a store in the 1820s) was for a time the world's only international post office. It had one postmaster, but two doors and two postal counters, each serving customers from a different country.

Residents 
An outcome of this unique geographical situation is that the drivers to the south are in the United States, while drivers to the north are in Canada. The American and Canadian families living on the street sometimes maintain friendships or relations. Before the September 11 attacks, crossing between sides of the road on foot was simple. But now, it is necessary to report to the border crossing office and ones who do not risk a fine. This complicates the lives of the residents.

References

External links 
 Pictures of Canusa Avenue
 Canusa Street: Where the dotted yellow line is the official US-CAN border via YouTube

Derby, Vermont
Roads in Estrie
Roads in Vermont
Stanstead, Quebec
Transportation in Orleans County, Vermont
Canada–United States border crossings